Vettelschoß is a municipality in the district of Neuwied in Rhineland-Palatinate, Germany. It includes the localities of Kalenborn, Kau, Oberwillscheid, and Willscheid, and forms part of the  Verbandsgemeinde (collective municipality) of Linz am Rhein.

The municipality is written with an ß, which may be replaced by ss if not available (Vettelschoss).

Vettelschoß's coat of arms was adopted in 1983.

The shoe-manufacturing company Birkenstock had its head office in Vettelschoß from the 1990s until the beginning of 2014, when it was moved to the nearby Neustadt (Wied).

References

Neuwied (district)